Dmitri Sergeyevich Khristis (born 7 May 1996) is a Russian football player.

Club career
He played his first game for the main squad of FC Rostov on 24 September 2015 in a Russian Cup game against FC Tosno.

References

External links
 

1996 births
Living people
Russian footballers
Association football defenders
FC Rostov players
Place of birth missing (living people)